The Rapid Exchange of Information System (RAPEX) is the European Union rapid alert system for unsafe consumer products and consumer protection. RAPEX does not encompass food and pharmaceutical products and drugs. It does cover products such as clothing, shoes, cosmetics, jewelry or toys with potentially harmful ingredients or quality or even products with technical faults, electrical appliances that present an electric shock or ignition hazard.

RAPEX allows a quick exchange of information on measures such as repatriation or product recalls, whether carried out by national authorities or by voluntary action of manufacturers and distributors. To monitor the activities of the European local and pertinent authorities such as are foodstuffs corresponding delivery lists submitted.

The basis for the establishment of RAPEX is the General Product Safety Directive 2001/95/EC (GPSD), an EC Directive on general product safety, which came into force on 15 January 2004.

The Directorate-General for Justice and Consumers of the European Commission publishes a weekly report on current RAPEX alerts.

References

External links 
 RAPEX notifications from the  EU-Commission
 EUROPA - Consumer Affairs - Safety - Rapid Alert System for non-food dangerous products (RAPEX)
 RAPEX Warnungen in deutscher Sprache - energyscout.eu EU zertifiziertes Verbraucherportal

European Commission
Online databases